This is a list of symphonies in A minor written by notable composers.

See also
For symphonies in A major, see List of symphonies in A major. For other keys, see List of symphonies by key.

References

A minor
Symphonies